"Lovertits" is a song by Canadian electroclash singer Peaches. It was released with the Lovertits EP in 2000 after Merrill Nisker adopted the performing name Peaches.

Critical reception
Mark Desrosiers of PopMatters commented that the "Roland 505 sets up a glorious soundscape, and the whole retro-sound is compelling and unique."

Les Inrockuptibles listed "Lovertits" at number 16 on their Best Singles of 2000 list. In addition, Muzik placed "Lovertits" at number 3 on their Best Singles of 2000 list. NME placed "Lovertits" at number 98 on their 100 Best Singles of 2000 list.

Music video
The song has a music video made in Super 8 format. The video shows Peaches dancing in front of a mirror and two girls riding suggestively on bicycles. One of these girls is Peaches' roommate, Feist.

Cover versions
Feist created a rendition of this song in collaboration with Gonzales which can be found on her remix album Open Season.

Track listing
German vinyl, 12-inch single 
 "Lovertits" – 4:46
 "Diddle My Skittle" – 4:50
 "AA XXX" – 4:33
 "Slap On" – 3:45

Song usage
In 2007, "Lovertits" was used in the movie Young People Fucking. It was also included on the DJ-Kicks: The Glimmers mix album.

References

2000 singles
Electroclash songs
Electronic songs
Peaches (musician) songs
Song recordings produced by Peaches (musician)
Songs written by Peaches (musician)
2000 songs